Manish Mehrotra, Corporate Chef, Indian Accent New Delhi, New York. 

Indian Accent offers an inventive approach to Indian cuisine. Its path breaking menu has been designed by Chef Manish Mehrotra. He reinterprets nostalgic Indian dishes with an openness towards global techniques and influences. Manish has been called the most exciting modern Indian chef in the world today.

Having started his career in Mumbai as part of Ananda Solomon's team at the Thai Pavillion of the Taj Hotels, he joined Old World Hospitality in 2000. Flooring the guests at Oriental Octopus with his culinary skills and charm, he has since spent about eighteen years with Old World Hospitality, opening several restaurants while travelling the world.

Manish is passionate about his craft, his knowledge of ingredients and their origins is immense. He is an inspiration to aspiring young chefs today.

He lives in New Delhi with his wife and daughter. Manish enjoys watching movies, cricket matches and cooking for his daughter, Adah, who is a foodie and loves prawns. Manish is an enthusiastic reader & has a collection of more than 1200 Cookbooks from across the globe.

He calls his cooking style "modern Indian cuisine" and as "Indian food with an international accent," or the other way around. He participated in the 2011 Gourmet Summit in Singapore, being the only Indian Chef to be invited.

Early life and education
He was born in Patna, Bihar and spent most of his childhood in Patna. He did his schooling from St. Xavier's High School, Patna and high school from New Era Public School, New Delhi. and hotel management from Institute of Hotel Management, Mumbai. Deciding to opt for hotel management was a conscious decision for Mehrotra and during the course he developed extreme liking for food production.

Career 
He started his career by getting selected as the Kitchen Management Trainee for the Taj Group of Hotels, where he mastered the art of pan Asian cuisine. Mehrotra joined Old World Hospitality's Oriental Octopus and travelled across Asia to train in Pan Asian Cuisine. In 2009, he designed the contemporary Indian menu of Indian Accent, at The Manor, New Delhi. The restaurant serves Indian food with global ingredients and techniques with the flavours and traditions of India.

Awards and honours
Chef Manish Mehrotra has been inducted into The Order of Escoffier Disciples. 

Awarded the No.1 Chef in India, The Economic Times 2018.

He has been awarded for Culinary Excellence at the Hello Hall Of Fame in 2018.

Chef Of the Year 2017, Eazydiner Foodie Awards.

Chef Of the Year, Living Foods Power list Awards 2016, Winner.

American Express, Best Chef of the Year 

Best Chef, Vir Sanghvi Award, HT City Crystal Awards.

Gourmet Guru of India, Food & Night Life Magazine Excellence Award For "Shining the World's Spotlight on India Condé Nast Traveller India Readers"

Indian Accent has been awarded the' S. Pellegrino Best Restaurant in India' by Asia's 50 Best Restaurants 2016 for the second consecutive year, under Chef Manish Mehrotra guidance & leadership.

Television appearances and other media 
Chef Manish Mehrotra was invited on Master Chef India 2015 as the Guest Chef.

He also featured in Foodistan, a television cooking game show produced by NDTV Good Times, in 2011.

Books and publications 
The Indian Accent Restaurant Cookbook is based on the restaurant's path-breaking contemporary Indian menu by award-winning chef Manish Mehrotra. With photographs by Rohit Chawla, among India’s foremost food photographers, the cookbook has a selection of Indian Accent recipes to excite the adventurous while satisfying traditional palates.

References 
4. Chef Manish Mehrotra Is On a Mission to Elevate Indian Cuisine for Fine Dining

5. The Indian Accent Restaurant Cookbook

Living people
Indian chefs
1974 births
People from Patna
St. Xavier's Patna alumni
Chefs of Indian cuisine